Hatsachai Sankla (born 	November 28, 1991) is a Thai professional footballer who plays as a goalkeeper for Thai League 3 club Pattaya Dolphins United.

Honour

Club
PT Prachuap FC
 Thai League Cup (1) : 2019

References

External links 
 

1991 births
Living people
Hatsachai Sankla
Association football goalkeepers
Hatsachai Sankla
Hatsachai Sankla
Hatsachai Sankla